Xanthoparmelia mougeotii is a species of foliose lichen belonging to the family Parmeliaceae.

Description
The lichen has a foliose thallus that is usually  in diameter. It consists of flattened greenish-grey to yellowish-grey lobes (about 0.2–0.5 mm wide) that are closely attached to the substrate. The lower surface is dark brown to black and has short, simple rhizines that are 0.1–0.2 mm long. Apothecia are rare, with brown discs, and sorediate margins. The predominant secondary compounds are usnic acid, stictic acid, and norstictic acid.

Habitat and distribution
Xanthoparmelia mougeotii typically grows on rocks, particularly ones that are smooth, and on a vertical surface. It is often found in scree fields, rock outcrops, cliffs, on boulders, stones, pebbles or siliceous conglomerates. The lichen has a distribution in temperate locales. It is found in Europe, the United States (including Hawaii), the Dominican Republic, South America, South Africa, and Asia.

See also
List of Xanthoparmelia species

References

mougeotii
Lichen species
Lichens described in 1846
Lichens of South Africa
Lichens of Asia
Lichens of Europe
Lichens of the Caribbean
Lichens of the United States
Lichens of South America
Fungi without expected TNC conservation status
Lichens of Hawaii
Taxa named by Ludwig Schaerer